Jean Epstein (25 March 1897 – 2 April 1953) was a French filmmaker, film theorist, literary critic, and novelist. Although he is remembered today primarily for his adaptation of Edgar Allan Poe's The Fall of the House of Usher, he directed three dozen films and was an influential critic of literature and film from the early 1920s through the late 1940s. He is often associated with French Impressionist Cinema and the concept of photogénie.

Life and career
Epstein was born in Warsaw, Kingdom of Poland (then a part of Russian Empire) to a French-Jewish father and Polish mother. After his father died in 1908, the family relocated to Switzerland, where Epstein remained until beginning medical school at the University of Lyon in France. While in Lyon, Epstein served as a secretary and translator for Auguste Lumière, considered one of the founders of cinema.

Epstein started directing his own films in 1922 with Pasteur, followed by L'Auberge rouge and Coeur fidèle (both 1923). Film director Luis Buñuel worked as an assistant director to Epstein on Mauprat (1926) and La Chute de la maison Usher (1928). Epstein's criticism appeared in the early modernist journal L'Esprit Nouveau. 

During the making of Coeur fidèle Epstein chose to film a simple story of love and violence "to win the confidence of those, still so numerous, who believe that only the lowest melodrama can interest the public", and also in the hope of creating "a melodrama so stripped of all the conventions ordinarily attached to the genre, so sober, so simple, that it might approach the nobility and excellence of tragedy". 

He made several documentaries about Brittany. These include Finis Terræ filmed in Ouessant, Mor vran (The sea of the crows, in Breton) filmed in Sein, L'Or des mers filmed in Hoëdic, Le Tempestaire filmed in Belle Île. 

Chanson d'Armor is known as the first Breton-language film in history. His two novels also take place in Breton isles: L'Or des mers in Ouessant and Les Recteurs et la sirène in Sein. In August 2005, his films The Three-Sided Mirror (1927) and Le Tempestaire (1947) were restored and re-released on the DVD collection Avant-Garde: Experimental Cinema of the 1920s and 1930s.

Epstein died in 1953 from a cerebral hemorrhage.

Filmography

Publications
Literary and film theory
 Bonjour, cinéma. Paris: La Sirène, 1921.
 La Poésie d'aujourd'hui, un nouvel état d'intelligence. Paris: La Sirène, 1921.
 La Lyrosophie. Paris: La Sirène, 1922.
 Le Cinématographe vu de l'Etna. Paris: Les Écrivains réunis, 1926.
 La Photogénie de l'impondérable. Paris: Corymbe, 1935.
 L'Intelligence d'une machine. Paris: J. Melot, 1946.
 Le Cinéma du diable. Paris: J. Melot, 1947.
 Esprit de cinéma. Genève: Jeheber, 1955.
 Écrits sur le cinéma, 1921-1953: édition chronologique en deux volumes. Paris: Seghers, 1974–1975.

Fiction
 Les Recteurs et la sirène. Paris: Fernand Aubier/Éd. Montaigne, 1934.
 L'Or des mers. Paris: Librairie Valois, 1932.

Film scenarios
 "La chute de la maison Usher," L'Avant scène du cinéma, nos. 313-314 (October 1983).

References

Further reading
 Jacques Aumont, ed., Jean Epstein: cinéaste, poète, philosophe. Paris: Cinémathèque française, 1998.
 Vincent Guigueno, Jean Epstein, cinéaste des îles. Paris: Jean Michel Place, 2003.
 Prosper Hillairet, Cœur fidèle de Jean Epstein. Crisnée: Yellow Now, 2008.
 Sarah Keller and Jason N. Paul, eds., Jean Epstein: Critical Essays and New Translations. Amsterdam: Amsterdam University Press, 2012.
 Pierre Leprohon, Jean Epstein. Paris: Seghers, 1964.
 Stuart Liebman, Jean Epstein's Early Film Theory, 1920-1922. PhD Dissertation: New York University, 1980.
 Trond Lundemo, Jean Epstein: intelligensen hos en maskin. Stockholm: Cinemateket, Svenska Filminstitutet, 2001.
 Laura Vichi, Jean Epstein. Milan: Il castoro, 2003.
 Christophe Wall-Romana, Jean Epstein: Corporeal Cinema and Film Philosophy. Manchester: Manchester University Press, 2013.
 Nicole Brenez, Ralph Eue (Ed.): Bonjour Cinéma und andere Schriften zum Kino''. FilmmuseumSynemaPublikationen, Vienna 2008,

External links

Jean Epstein at Allmovie
Le Cinéma du diable

1897 births
1953 deaths
Film theorists
French experimental filmmakers
French film directors
French people of Polish-Jewish descent